Eugene-Springfield Pride Festival is an annual event held in August in Alton Baker Park, that celebrates and Promotes Respect In Diverse Expression (P.R.I.D.E.) for the LGBTQ communities' culture.

Background 
Eugene is Oregon's second biggest city and home to the University of Oregon. The festival began in 1991 and is organized several weeks after Pride Northwest, which takes place in the city of Portland.

The event coordinator, Paul Homan describes the festival saying:

"It's about being proud of who you are, no matter what you are, who you love, you have the right to respect, the right to dignity and the right to love."

Activities 
Over 50 organizations and businesses related to the theme are also provided with the space to exhibit their work. Also, visitors can find a beer garden, a kids' space, and food.

It also offers free HIV testing, which is  provided by the HIV Alliance in Lane County. The festival was cancelled in 2020 due to Covid, but resumed in 2021.

The local gay-popular bars and restaurants engage in the event and open their doors for the visitors, which is considered as a boost for the local economy of these businesses.

Festival's welcoming note 
we want to Welcome! all deaf to this year

Eugene PRIDE Day Equality

No matter Gay, Straight, or bi

Lesbian, Transgendered DEAF life

I'm on the right track baby

I was born to survive

No matter black, white or beige

Chola or orient made

I'm on the right track baby

I was born to be brave

See also

 LGBT culture in Eugene, Oregon
 List of LGBT events

References

External links 

Annual events in Oregon
Culture of Eugene, Oregon
LGBT events in Oregon